The 11th Mississippi Infantry Statue is a Gettysburg Battlefield memorial commemorating a Confederate regiment with a bronze sculpture of a flagbearer of the 11th Mississippi Infantry Regiment.

History
The 2nd South Carolina String Band performed at the dedication.

References

Gettysburg Battlefield monuments and memorials
Confederate States of America monuments and memorials in Pennsylvania
2000 sculptures
Bronze sculptures in Pennsylvania
Outdoor sculptures in Pennsylvania
2000 establishments in Pennsylvania